Elections to Northampton Borough Council were held on 1 May 2003.  The whole council was up for election and the Labour Party lost overall control of the council to no overall control.

Election result

|}

Ward results

External links
2003 Northampton election result

2003 English local elections
2003
2000s in Northamptonshire